Delrio is a surname and may refer to:

 Graziano Delrio (born 1960), Italian medical doctor and politician
 Martin Delrio (1551–1608), Jesuit theologian
 Kyanna Delrio, a dateable character in the dating simulation videogame HuniePop

See also
 Del Rio (disambiguation)